Status epilepticus (SE), or status seizure, is a medical condition consisting of a single seizure lasting more than 5 minutes, or 2 or more seizures within a 5-minute period without the person returning to normal between them. Previous definitions used a 30-minute time limit. The seizures can be of the tonic–clonic type, with a regular pattern of contraction and extension of the arms and legs, or of types that do not involve contractions, such as absence seizures or complex partial seizures. Status epilepticus is a life-threatening medical emergency, particularly if treatment is delayed.

Status epilepticus may occur in those with a history of epilepsy as well as those with an underlying problem of the brain. These underlying brain problems may include trauma, infections, or strokes, among others. Diagnosis often involves checking the blood sugar, imaging of the head, a number of blood tests, and an electroencephalogram. Psychogenic nonepileptic seizures may present similarly to status epilepticus. Other conditions that may also appear to be status epilepticus include low blood sugar, movement disorders, meningitis, and delirium, among others. Status epilepticus can also appear when tuberculous meningitis becomes very severe.

Benzodiazepines are the preferred initial treatment, after which typically phenytoin is given. Possible benzodiazepines include intravenous lorazepam as well as intramuscular injections of midazolam. A number of other medications may be used if these are not effective, such as phenobarbital, propofol, or ketamine. After initial treatment with benzodiazepines, typical antiseizure drugs should be given, including valproic acid (valproate), fosphenytoin, levetiracetam, or a similar substance(s). While empirically-based treatments exist, few head-to-head clinical trials exist, so the best approach remains undetermined. This said, "consensus-based" best practices are offered by the Neurocritical Care Society. Intubation may be required to help maintain the person's airway. Between 10% and 30% of people who have status epilepticus die within 30 days. The underlying cause, the person's age, and the length of the seizure are important factors in the outcome. Status epilepticus occurs in up to 40 per 100,000 people per year. Those with status epilepticus make up about 1% of people who visit the emergency department.

Signs and symptoms
Status epilepticus can be divided into two categories: convulsive and nonconvulsive (NCSE).

Convulsive
Convulsive status epilepticus presents with a regular pattern of contraction and extension of the arms and legs.

Epilepsia partialis continua is a variant involving hour-, day-, or even week-long jerking. It is a consequence of vascular disease, tumors, or encephalitis, and is drug-resistant.

Generalized myoclonus is commonly seen in comatose people following CPR and is seen by some as an indication of catastrophic damage to the neocortex.

Refractory status epilepticus is defined as status epilepticus that continues despite treatment with benzodiazepines and one antiepileptic drug.

Super-refractory status epilepticus is defined as status epilepticus that continues or recurs 24 hours or more after the onset of anaesthetic therapy, including those cases where status epilepticus recurs on the reduction or withdrawal of anesthesia.

Nonconvulsive
Nonconvulsive status epilepticus is a relatively long duration change in a person's level of consciousness without large scale bending and extension of the limbs due to seizure activity. It is of two main types with either prolonged complex partial seizures or absence seizures. Up to a quarter of cases of SE are nonconvulsive.

In the case of complex partial status epilepticus, the seizure is confined to a small area of the brain, normally the temporal lobe. Absence status epilepticus is marked by a generalized seizure affecting the whole brain. An EEG is needed to differentiate between the two conditions. This results in episodes characterized by a long-lasting stupor, staring, and unresponsiveness.

Causes

Only 25% of people who experience seizures or status epilepticus have epilepsy. The following is a list of possible causes:
 Stroke
 Hemorrhage
 Intoxicants or adverse reactions to drugs
 Insufficient dosage or sudden withdrawal of a medication (especially anticonvulsants)
Insufficient dosage or sudden withdrawal of benzodiazepine(s) medication (akin to alcohol withdrawal); itself a class of antiseizure/anticonvulsant medications
 Consumption of alcoholic beverages while on an anticonvulsant, or alcohol withdrawal
 Dieting or fasting while on an anticonvulsant
 Starting on a new medication that reduces the effectiveness of the anticonvulsant or changes drug metabolism, decreasing its half-life, leading to decreased blood concentrations
 Developing a resistance to an anticonvulsant already being used
 Gastroenteritis while on an anticonvulsant, where lower levels of anticonvulsant may exist in the bloodstream due to vomiting of gastric contents or reduced absorption due to mucosal edema
 Developing a new, unrelated condition in which seizures are coincidentally also a symptom, but are not controlled by an anticonvulsant already used
 Metabolic disturbances—such as affected kidney and liver
 Sleep deprivation of more than a short duration is often the cause of a (usually, but not always, temporary) loss of seizure control
Dehydration – moderate- to severe, especially when combined with any single factor above

Diagnosis
Diagnostic criteria vary, though most practitioners diagnose as status epilepticus for: one continuous, unremitting seizure lasting longer than five minutes, or recurrent seizures without regaining consciousness between seizures for greater than five minutes. Previous definitions used a 30-minute time limit.

Nonconvulsive status epilepticus is believed to be under-diagnosed.

New-onset refractory status epilepticus (NORSE) is defined as status epilepticus that does not respond to an anticonvulsant and lacks an obvious cause after two days of investigation.

Treatments

Benzodiazepines are the preferred initial treatment after which typically phenytoin or fosphenytoin is given. First aid guidelines for seizures state that, as a rule, an ambulance should be called for seizures lasting longer than five minutes (or sooner if this is the person's first seizure episode and no precipitating factors are known, or if said SE happens to a person with epilepsy whose seizures were previously absent or well-controlled for a considerable time).

Benzodiazepines
When given intravenously, lorazepam appears to be superior to diazepam for stopping seizure activity. Intramuscular midazolam appears to be a reasonable alternative especially in those who are not in hospital.

The benzodiazepine of choice in North America for initial treatment is lorazepam, due to its relatively long duration of action (2–8 hours) when injected, and particularly due to its rapid onset of action, which is thought to be due to its high affinity for GABA receptors and low lipid solubility. This causes the drug to remain in the vascular compartment. If lorazepam is not available, or intravenous access is not possible, then diazepam should be given. Alternatively, medication, such as glucagon, should be given through the bone (intraosseously).

In several countries outside North America, such as the Netherlands, intravenous clonazepam is regarded as the drug of first choice. Cited advantages of clonazepam include a longer duration of action than diazepam and a lower propensity for the development of acute tolerance than lorazepam. The use of clonazepam for this indication is not recognized in North America, perhaps because it is not available as an intravenous formulation there.

Particularly in children, another popular treatment choice is midazolam, given into the side of the mouth or the nose. Sometimes, the failure of lorazepam alone is considered to be enough to classify a case of SE as refractory–that is, resistant to treatment.

Phenytoin and fosphenytoin
Phenytoin was once another first-line therapy, although the prodrug fosphenytoin can be administered three times as fast and with far fewer injection site reactions. If these or any other hydantoin derivatives are used, then cardiac monitoring is necessary if they are administered intravenously. Because the hydantoins take 15–30 minutes to work, a benzodiazepine or barbiturate is often coadministered. Because of diazepam's short duration of action, they were often administered together anyway. At present, these remain recommended second-line, follow-up treatments in the acute setting per guidelines by groups like Neurocritical Care Society (United States).

Barbiturates
Before the benzodiazepines were invented, barbiturates were used for purposes similar to benzodiazepines in general. Some are still used today in SE, for instance, if benzodiazepines or the hydantoins are not an option. These are used to induce a barbituric coma. The barbiturate most commonly used for this is phenobarbital. Thiopental or pentobarbital may also be used for that purpose if the seizures have to be stopped immediately or if the person has already been compromised by the underlying illness or toxic/metabolic-induced seizures; however, in those situations, thiopental is the agent of choice. That said, even when benzodiazepines are available, certain algorithms–including in the United States–indicate the use of phenobarbital as a second- or third-line treatment in SE. Such use is adjunctive. At least one U.S. study showed phenobarbital, when used alone, controlled about 60% of seizures, hence its preference as an add-on therapy.

Carbamazepine and valproate
Valproate is available to be given intravenously, and may be used for status epilepticus. Carbamazepine is not available in an intravenous formulation, and does not play a role in status epilepticus.

Others
If this proves ineffective or if barbiturates cannot be used for some reason, then a general anesthetic such as propofol may be tried; sometimes it is used second after the failure of lorazepam. This would entail putting the person on artificial ventilation. Propofol has been shown to be effective in suppressing the jerks seen in myoclonus status epilepticus.

Ketamine, an NMDA antagonist drug, can be used as a last resort for drug-resistant status epilepticus.

Lidocaine has been used in cases that do not improve with other more typical medications. One concern is that seizures often begin again 30 minutes after it is stopped. Additionally, it is not recommended in those with heart or liver problems.

Prognosis
While sources vary, about 16 to 20% of first-time SE patients die; with other sources indicating between 10 and 30% of such patients die within 30 days. Further, 10-50% of first-time SE patients experience lifelong disabilities. In the 30% mortality figure, the great majority of these people have an underlying brain condition causing their status seizure such as brain tumor, brain infection, brain trauma, or stroke. However, people with diagnosed epilepsy who have a status seizure also have an increased risk of death if their condition is not stabilized quickly, their medication and sleep regimen adapted and adhered to, and stress and other stimulant (seizure trigger) levels controlled.
However, with optimal neurological care, adherence to the medication regimen, and a good prognosis (no other underlying uncontrolled brain or other organic disease), the person—even people who have been diagnosed with epilepsy—in otherwise good health can survive with minimal or no brain damage, and can decrease risk of death and even avoid future seizures.

Epidemiology
In the United States, about 40 cases of SE occur annually per 100,000 people. This includes about 10–20% of all first seizures.

Research
Allopregnanolone is being studied in a clinical trial by the Mayo Clinic to treat super-resistant status epilepticus.

See also 
 Status asthmaticus
 Status angiotensus

References

External links

 Evidence-Based Guideline: Treatment of Convulsive Status Epilepticus in Children and Adults: Report of the Guideline Committee of the American Epilepsy Society
 

Medical emergencies
Epilepsy
Seizure types
Wikipedia medicine articles ready to translate
Wikipedia emergency medicine articles ready to translate